The members of the 17th Manitoba Legislature were elected in the Manitoba general election held in July 1922. The legislature sat from January 18, 1923, to June 4, 1927.

The United Farmers of Manitoba formed the government. John Bracken, who had not run in the election, was chosen as party leader. He was subsequently elected to the assembly in a deferred election held in The Pas. The United Farmers would later identify themselves as the Progressive Party.

Tobias Norris of the Liberals was Leader of the Opposition.

In a 1923 referendum, Manitoba voters approved the sale of beer and wine under the control of the government, ending prohibition in the province.

Philippe Adjutor Talbot served as speaker for the assembly.

There were six sessions of the 17th Legislature:

James Albert Manning Aikins was Lieutenant Governor of Manitoba until October 9, 1926, when Theodore Arthur Burrows became lieutenant governor.

Members of the Assembly 
The following members were elected to the assembly in 1922:

Notes:

By-elections 
By-elections were held to replace members for various reasons:

Notes:

References 

Terms of the Manitoba Legislature
1923 establishments in Manitoba
1927 disestablishments in Manitoba